Hysterica is the fourth studio album by guitarist Jukka Tolonen, released in 1975 through Love Records; a remastered edition was reissued in 2004.

Overview
Hysterica is more rock-oriented than its jazz fusion predecessor, The Hook. "Jimi" and "Django" are tributes to guitarists Jimi Hendrix and Django Reinhardt, respectively. "Silva the Cat" features synthesisers emulating the mewling of a cat, whereas the flutes evoke graceful feline movements. "Tiger" displays muscular, hard rock guitar improvisation. Closing the album is "Windermere Avenue", a mid-tempo pop song with tinges of country blues in Tolonen's lead guitar. It became a minor hit on Finnish radio in 1976, whereupon it was reissued on the compilation LP Crossection. The song is a paean to the idyllic quietude of the street, which is some ten kilometres north of central London, in the borough of Barnet.

Track listing

Personnel
Jukka Tolonen – guitar, piano (track 6)
Esa Kotilainen – synthesizer, clavinet, organ
Esko Rosnell – drums, percussion
Heikki Virtanen – bass (except track 4)
Pekka Pohjola – bass (track 4)
Pekka Pöyry – alto saxophone, soprano saxophone, flute (except track 4)
Sakari Kukko – soprano saxophone, flute (track 4)
Otto Donner – production

References

Jukka Tolonen albums
1975 albums
Love Records albums